Guaporation Canal is the 10th album and 3rd mixtape by rapper Mr. Serv-On released on September 10, 2014. It was produced by Blac Kingpin. On "datpiff.com" it says that the mixtape is under the alias Serv 4000, which is one of Mr. Serv-On's aliases.

Track listing

 Welcome to New Orleans
 F.U. Serv (Ft. Fred Lee)
 Been Bout It (Ft. Fred Lee)
 Bitch Hoe (Ft Pearl White Ace Dollaz)
 HotBlockShawty
 Talkdat (Ft. Bumpy Big Zuse)
 I'm Tired (Ft. Cutty Chealsea)
 Hating (Ft. Jakk-Jo)
 Lebron (Ft. Law Fleeze)
 Talking Versace
 I'm Getting
 Paradise Girl (Ft. Cold Play)
 I Am Serv (Ft. Magic)
 Love Jones
 I Represent
 Hands On The Wall
 I'm Sorry
 I'm Outchere
 Good Music

References

2014 albums
Mr. Serv-On albums